Mandrill Studios was a recording studio in Parnell, a suburb of Auckland, New Zealand. Many of New Zealand's prominent artists have had their work recorded there.

Background
The studio was located in the Auckland suburb of Parnell on York Street. It was owned by former 60s pop singers Glyn Tucker, Dave Hurley, along with composer and producer, Gary Daverne. Around 1980, Hurley and Daverne pulled out of the business, leaving Tucker as the sole owner.

Producers
In 1979, Kim Fowley, a producer from the United States, produced the five man group Streettalk at Mandrill Studios.

Artists recorded
During the 1980s, artists such as Dance Exponents, The Mockers, Pink Flamingoes and the Screaming MeeMees were recorded there. The Mauri Hikitia album, which featured Rhonda, Ken Kincaid, and Deane Waretini was recorded there.

List (selective)
 The Citizen Band - Citizen Band - 1978
 The Citizen Band - Just Drove Thru Town - 1979
 Desire - Desire - 1985
 Dance Exponents - Expectations - 1985

References

Recording studios in Auckland, New Zealand
Auckland CBD